Vacation Friends is a 2021 American buddy comedy film directed by Clay Tarver, who co-wrote the film with Tom Mullen, Tim Mullen, Jonathan Goldstein and John Francis Daley. It stars Lil Rel Howery, John Cena, Yvonne Orji, Meredith Hagner, Robert Wisdom, Lynn Whitfield, and Andrew Bachelor.

Distributed by 20th Century Studios, Vacation Friends was released on Hulu on August 27, 2021, receiving mixed reviews from critics. A sequel titled Honeymoon Friends is in development.

Plot
Marcus and Emily are on vacation in Mexico, where he intends to propose. His plan is ruined when first their room is flooded, and then a hotel employee ruins the surprise. With no other choice, Marcus proposes to her on the spot in the lobby, and she accepts. Wild and carefree Ron and Kyla watch their special moment, inviting them to stay with them for their trip.

The four spend their vacation together, which includes Marcus and Emily eloping. Both black out due to excessive drinking but Marcus briefly regains consciousness during what appears to be Kyla having sex with him. The next day, Emily remembers nothing from the night before and Marcus decides to keep what he recalls a secret. At the end of their vacation, Marcus and Emily decide to cut ties with Ron and Kyla.

Months later, Marcus and Emily have their official wedding, hosted by Emily's parents, Harold and Suzanne. They, especially Harold, don't approve of Marcus, partly because of an incident where Marcus punched Emily's brother Gabe. Harold entrusts Marcus with the rings for the wedding, which belonged to Emily's great-grandparents.

Before the ceremony, Ron and Kyla crash the reception after discovering the wedding location online. Harold is initially furious at the intrusion, but instantly welcomes the couple after learning that Ron was a fellow Green Beret. Kyla reveals she is pregnant and Marcus is 'directly involved' in the pregnancy, making him believe that he is the baby's father. The next day, Ron speaks to Harold, convincing him to give Marcus a second chance. A grateful Marcus selects Ron to be best man, and Ron convinces Marcus to entrust him with the rings.

The next day, the men go golfing, with Gabe and his friend. To Marcus's chagrin, Ron suggests they bet on the game. Halfway through the round, Ron reveals that he bankrolled the wagers by pawning the wedding rings. On the final hole, Ron makes a massive bet that he can hit the 18th green in a single stroke. Despite Ron initially looking at the wrong green, forcing him to make a 375-yard shot to win the bet, he miraculously sinks a hole in one to win the bet. (Actually, he had bribed a golf course employee to plant the ball in the hole.)

After returning to the pawnshop to retrieve the rings, Ron accidentally causes Marcus to drop the rings in a sewer grate. Marcus chokes Ron in anger, who reveals that he was told by a doctor that he was sterile and that Kyla got pregnant 'because of Marcus'.

At the rehearsal dinner, Kyla prepares to make a speech, where it seems like she is going to announce that Marcus is the father of her child. He interrupts, sharing the full story of what he believes happened in Mexico, only for Kyla to reveal they only intend to name the baby after Marcus, and he is not the father. Marcus tells an angry Harold the rings were lost and a fight ensues. Outside the wedding hall, Marcus and Emily angrily demand that Ron and Kyla leave.

Emily's grandma, Phyllis delivers a wedding gift from Kyla. The letter inside reveals that Ron had lost his previous best friend Charlie (on military duty) and that his relationship with her and Marcus has helped him to recover. The gift is the wedding rings, which Ron retrieved from the sewer. Emily and Marcus realize they made a mistake by sending Kyla and Ron away, so they eventually find them. The four reunite, while Ron and Kyla reveal they are finally planning to marry, holding the same ceremony in Mexico where Marcus and Emily tied the knot, along with their family and friends joining.

Cast
 John Cena as Ron, Kyla's partner
 Lil Rel Howery as Marcus Parker, Emily's partner
 Yvonne Orji as Emily Conway-Parker, Marcus’ wife, Harold and Suzanne's daughter
 Meredith Hagner as Kyla, Ron's partner
 Andrew Bachelor as Gabe
 Lynn Whitfield as Suzanne Conway, Emily's mother and Harold's wife
 Robert Wisdom as Harold Conway, Emily's father and Suzanne's husband
 Tawny Newsome as Brooke
 Kamal Bolden as Bennet
 Barry Rothbart as Darren
 Anna Maria Horsford as Nancy
Carlos Santos as Maurillio

Production
In March 2014, it was announced Chris Pratt and Anna Faris were set to star in the film, with Steve Pink set to direct from a screenplay by Tom and Tim Mullen, and 20th Century Fox distributing. In November 2015, it was reported Ice Cube had signed on to replace Pratt, with Faris no longer attached. In December 2019, it was announced John Cena, Lil Rel Howery, and Meredith Hagner would star in the film instead, with Clay Tarver replacing Pink, 20th Century Studios attached to produce, and Hulu set to distribute. In January 2020, Yvonne Orji joined the cast of the film. In March 2020, Tawny Newsome and Barry Rothbart were added as well, and in September 2020, Lynn Whitfield, Robert Wisdom and Kamal Bolden also signed on to co-star.

Principal photography began in Georgia in March 2020. However, production was halted due to the COVID-19 pandemic. Production resumed in September 2020, and concluded in October 2020.

Release
The film was released on Hulu on August 27, 2021, in the United States, Disney+ in international markets such as Canada and the United Kingdom. It was released as a launch title on Star+ on August 31 in Latin America. Disney+ Hotstar released the film in India on August 27, and in select territories on September 3, 2021.

Reception
On the review aggregator website Rotten Tomatoes the film holds an approval rating of 58% based on 74 reviews, with an average rating of 5.60/10. The critics consensus reads, "The laughs aren't always in steady supply, but the terrific cast makes Vacation Friends a comedy you can stream without serious reservations." According to Metacritic, which sampled 16 critics and calculated a weighted average score of 49 out of 100, the film received "mixed or average reviews".

Glenn Kenny of The New York Times stated that the movie's strength resides in its cast that successfully manages to provide entertainment, while finding Clay Tarver's direction skillful compared to what other buddy comedy movie directors provide. Matthew Aguilar of Comicbook.com rated the movie 4 out of 5 stars, found that the chemistry between the cast members delivers delight, praised the performances of the actors, while finding that Tarver's direction skillfully captures the attention of the audience with his own perspective on the buddy comedy genre. Matt Fowler of IGN rated the movie 7 out of 10 and praised the chemistry between the characters, complimented the performances of the cast, stating that both Cena and Meredith Hagner have a natural aptitude to provide a sharp humor, despite finding the movie unsurprising with its plot. Brandon Katz of Observer rated the film 2.5 out of 4 stars, claimed that the movie proves Cena is successfully able to portray characters in the comedy genre, found the soundtrack and classic humor of the movie enjoyable, despite finding it a bit generic compared to other buddy comedy movies.

Sequel
In September 2021, it was reported that a sequel titled Honeymoon Friends was in development, with the cast and Clay Tarver set to return.

References

External links
  at 20th Century Studios
 at Hulu

2021 films
2021 comedy films
2020s buddy comedy films
20th Century Studios films
American buddy comedy films
Film productions suspended due to the COVID-19 pandemic
Films about vacationing
Films scored by Rolfe Kent
Films shot in Georgia (U.S. state)
Hulu original films
2020s English-language films
2020s American films